El Torito is a Mexican chain restaurant.

El Torito may also refer to:

Espectrito (1966–2016), ring name of professional wrestler
Mascarita Dorada (born 1982), former WWE wrestler who performed under the ring name El Torito
El Torito (CD-ROM standard), CD-ROM specification used to allow a computer to boot from a CD-ROM
The nickname of the singer Héctor Acosta
A character in Ustedes los ricos

See also
Torito, a Mexican cocktail
El Toro (disambiguation)